CJBX-FM is a radio station in London, Ontario. Owned by Bell Media, it broadcasts a country format. Its studios are located at 1 Communications Road, along with CIQM-FM, CJBK and CFPL-DT while its transmitter is located on Cromarty Dr near Hwy 401 and Westchester Bourne east of London.

History
CJBX signed on the air on March 3, 1980 and has been a country station for its entire history. Except for a brief time in the early 90s when it was known as Country 92.7, it had always been known as BX93.

On May 28, 2019, the station rebranded as Pure Country 93, as part of a nationwide rebranding.

References

External links
 
 

Jbx
Radio stations established in 1980
Jbx
JBX
1980 establishments in Ontario